1992 Croatian First A League was the first season of First A League. It was the first season of Croatian handball to be played after their departure from the Yugoslav First League. The tournament started 21 March 1992. No teams were relegated during this season.

First phase

Championship play-offs

Final standings

Sources
 Fredi Kramer, Dražen Pinević: Hrvatski rukomet = Croatian handball, Zagreb, 2009.; page 178
 Petar Orgulić: 50 godina rukometa u Rijeci, Rijeka, 2004.; pages 217 and 218
 Kruno Sabolić: Hrvatski športski almanah 1992/1993, Zagreb, 1992.

References

External links
Croatian Handball Federation
Croatian Handball Portal

1992
handball
handball
Croatia